Dziemięrzyce  (Dziemierzyce until 31 December 2012) is a village in the administrative district of Gmina Racławice, within Miechów County, Lesser Poland Voivodeship, in southern Poland.

The village has a population of 200.

References

Dziemierzyce